Slow Burning Lights is a collaborative studio album by American hip hop production duo Blue Sky Black Death and singer Yes Alexander. It was released by Babygrande Records in 2008.

Critical reception
Andrew Martin of PopMatters gave the album 8 stars out of 10, describing it as "a combination of dreamy textures over sometimes erratic, glitchy drums with that traditional BSBD quality that is almost impossible to categorize." Josh Modell of Spin said: "It's never as punchily trip-hoppy as Sneaker Pimps or as blatantly out-there as Joanna Newsom, but the fittingly named Slow Burning Lights sits on the same off-kilter pop continuum."

Track listing

References

External links
 

2008 albums
Collaborative albums
Blue Sky Black Death albums
Babygrande Records albums